Mesophleps acutunca is a moth of the family Gelechiidae. It is found in China (Hunan, Henan).

The forewings are ochreous yellow, scattered with ochreous brown scales.

Etymology
The species name is derived from the Latin prefix acut- (meaning acute) and Latin uncus (meaning uncus) and refers to the small, acute, bud-shaped uncus.

References

External links

Moths described in 2012
Endemic fauna of China
acutunca